The 1988 NCAA Division I women's basketball tournament began on March 16 and ended on April 3. The tournament featured 40 teams. The Final Four consisted of Long Beach State, Auburn, Tennessee, and Louisiana Tech. Louisiana Tech won its second title with a 56-54 victory over Auburn.  Louisiana Tech's Erica Westbrooks was named the Most Outstanding Player of the tournament.

Notable events
Long Beach state reached the Final Four averaging over 100 points per game. Long Beach beat Colorado 103–64 in their opening game. Long Beach then defeated the three seed Washington 104–78 in the West Regional semifinal. That matched Long Beach up with the one seed Iowa. Long Beach didn't score 100, but came close, beating the top seed in their regional by a score of 98–78, allowing Long Beach to reach the Final Four for the second straight year. Their opponent in the semifinal was Auburn, who had reached the Sweet Sixteen in 1985 and 1986, then followed it with a trip to the Elite Eight in 1987. This year Auburn advanced to the Final Four for the first time defeating Maryland in the Mideast Regional 103–74.

In the semifinal game, the Long Beach 49ers team started out slowly, but their coach Joan Bonvicini wasn't worried; she was convinced they would come back. Auburn had a small lead in the second half when the 49ers scored 11 consecutive points to take a 46–42 lead. However, the Tigers tied the game at 46 apiece, then 48 then 50 apiece. Then the Tigers opened up a seven-point lead. The 49ers cut it back to five points, but too many turnovers were too much to overcome. Ruthie Bolton scored eleven points in the final six minutes for the Tigers to help seal the 68–55 victory, and the right to play for the national championship.

The other semifinal game matched up Tennessee and Louisiana Tech. Tennessee was the defending national champion, having won their first national championship in 1987. They won the East Regional with a win over the two seed Virginia. Their opponent, Louisiana Tech, had won the first NCAA Tournament in 1982, and had finished as runner up to Tennessee in the previous year's championship game. The two teams met in the regular season, with Tennessee winning 76–74 in an overtime game played in Knoxville. The Lady Techsters were a two seed, but upset top ranked Texas 83–80 in the Midwest Regional to make it to the semifinal game. The Lady Techsters said they had been looking forward to this game ever since their loss in the prior year and they played like it. They took the lead early in the game and never relinquished it. Louisiana Tech held Tennessee to 33% shooting in the first half, and held on to win the game 68–59, and a berth in the championship game.

The first half of the championship game was all Auburn. Two minutes went by before the Lady Techsters even took at shot, at which point they were down 6–0. Ruthie Bolton scored 16 points in the first half, a source of frustration for her defender Teresa Weatherspoon. Bolton's points held the Tigers head to halftime with a 31–19 lead. Weatherspoon made sure the second half was different, both offensively, with seven assists and defensively, holding Bolton to zero points and helping to force six turnovers. The Tigers still led by four points with under five minutes left, but behind Weatherspoon's defense, and  Erica Westbrooks' 25 points, Louisiana Tech came back to win their second national Championship by a score of 56–54.

Records
Ruthie Bolton was credited with ten steals in the National Semifinal game, the most ever recorded in a Final Four game since the statistic has been recorded (starting in 1988).

Qualifying teams – automatic
Forty teams were selected to participate in the 1988 NCAA Tournament. Eighteen conferences were eligible for an automatic bid to the 1988 NCAA tournament.

Qualifying teams – at-large
Twenty-two additional teams were selected to complete the forty invitations.

Bids by conference
Eighteen conferences earned an automatic bid. In eight cases, the automatic bid was the only representative from the conference. Two conferences, Southland and American South sent a single representative as an at-large team. Twenty additional at-large teams were selected from ten of the conferences.

First and second rounds
In 1988, the field remained at 40 teams. The teams were seeded, and assigned to four geographic regions, with seeds 1-10 in each region. In Round 1, seeds 8 and 9 faced each other for the opportunity to face the 1 seed in the second round, while seeds 7 and 10 faced each other for the opportunity to face the 2 seed.
In  the first two rounds, the higher seed was given the opportunity to host the first round game. In most cases, the higher seed accepted the opportunity. The exception:
 Seventh seeded Colorado played tenth seeded Eastern Illinois  at Eastern Illinois

The following table lists the region, host school, venue and the twenty-four first and second round locations:

Regionals and Final Four

The regionals, named  for the general location, were held from March 24 to March 26 at these sites:

 Mideast Regional  Georgia Coliseum (Stegeman Coliseum), Athens, Georgia (Host: University of Georgia)
 Midwest Regional  Frank Erwin Center, Austin, Texas (Host: University of Texas)
 West Regional  University Gym (Gold Mine), Long Beach, California (Host:  Long Beach State)
 East Regional  Old Dominion University Fieldhouse, Norfolk, Virginia (Host: Old Dominion University)

Each regional winner  advanced to the Final Four, held April 1 and April 3 in Tacoma, Washington at the Tacoma Dome, co-hosted by Seattle University & University of Washington.

Bids by state

The forty teams came from twenty-five states.
Pennsylvania had the most teams with four.  Twenty-five states did not have any teams receiving bids.

Brackets
First and second round games played at higher seed except where noted.

West regional – Long Beach, CA (Long Beach Arena)

Mideast regional – Athens, GA (Stegeman Coliseum)

East regional – Norfolk, VA (Old Dominion University Fieldhouse)

Midwest regional – Austin, Texas (Frank Erwin Center)

Final Four – Tacoma, WA (Tacoma Dome)

Record by  conference
Fifteen conferences had more than one  bid, or at least one win in NCAA Tournament play:

Five conferences went  0-1: High Country, MAC, Missouri Valley Conference, Mountain West, and Ohio Valley Conference

All-Tournament team

 Erica Westbrooks, Louisiana Tech
 Teresa Weatherspoon, Louisiana Tech
 Ruthie Bolton, Auburn
 Diann McNeil, Auburn
 Penny Toler, Long Beach St.

Game officials

 June Courteau  (semifinal)
 Larry Sheppard (semifinal)
 Art Bomengen (Semi-Final, Final)
 Patty Broderick (Semi-Final, Final)

See also
 1988 NCAA Division I men's basketball tournament
 1988 NCAA Division II women's basketball tournament
 1988 NCAA Division III women's basketball tournament
 1988 NAIA women's basketball tournament

References

 
NCAA Division I women's basketball tournament
Basketball competitions in Austin, Texas
 
NCAA Division I women's basketball tournament
NCAA Division I women's basketball tournament
NCAA Division I women's basketball tournament
Sports competitions in Tacoma, Washington
Basketball competitions in Washington (state)